Mordecai Marceli Roshwald (May 26, 1921 – March 19, 2015) was an American academic and writer. Born in Drohobycz, Ukraine to Jewish parents, Roshwald later emigrated to Israel. His most famous work is Level 7 (1959), a post-apocalyptic science-fiction novel. He is also the author of A Small Armageddon (1962) and Dreams and Nightmares: Science and Technology in Myth and Fiction (2008).

Roshwald was a "professor emeritus of humanities at the University of Minnesota, and a visiting professor at many universities worldwide."

He lived in Silver Spring, Maryland, at the time of his death.

References

External links

 Mike Strozier, "An Interview With Author Dr. Mordecai Roshwald", Bookpleasures, November 22, 2009.

1921 births
2015 deaths
20th-century American novelists
American male novelists
American science fiction writers
Polish emigrants to Israel
American people of Polish-Jewish descent
American male short story writers
20th-century American short story writers
20th-century American male writers
Israeli emigrants to the United States